Eastmont is a census-designated place (CDP) in Snohomish County, Washington, United States. The population was 20,101 at the 2010 census. Eastmont is one of two CDPs that were created out of the former Seattle Hill-Silver Firs CDP in 2010, the other being Silver Firs. Eastmont is the location of Community Transit's Eastmont Park & Ride, which is serviced by Sound Transit Express route 513.

Geography 
Eastmont is located at  (47.897402, -122.181536).

According to the United States Census Bureau, the CDP has a total area of 5.112 square miles (13.24 km), of which, 5.091 square miles (13.19 km) of it is land and 0.021 square miles (0.05 km) of it (0.41%) is water.

The CDP is surrounded by the City of Everett and contains several large residential neighborhoods.

References 

Census-designated places in Washington (state)
Census-designated places in Snohomish County, Washington